Lam Tian Xing (formerly known as Lam Sin), also known as “Master of the Hall of Boundlessness”, is a color ink painter. He has been studying and practicing Chinese painting, Western painting and Chinese calligraphy since age fourteen. 

During 30 years of artistic exploration, his style blended the traditional framework of Chinese ink color painting with western techniques. He applies rich, vibrant colors to form layered images that are both abstract and concrete. 

Lam was twice invited by the Chinese Ministry of Culture to paint on the theme of Hong Kong views. The paintings, ”Morning Songs” and “Sideview in Victoria Harbour”, accompanied the space journeys of Shenzhou VI and Shenzhou VII in 2005 and 2008 respectively. 

Since the late 1990s Lam has created a series of works on the theme of Hong Kong scenery and landscapes. He travelled to Tibet three times, risking his life, and created his “Tibet in Tian Xing” series. 

His series “Lotus in Tian Xing” uniquely marked his personal artistic development. His paintings are well received by public and private collectors alike, both local and overseas.

Early life 
Lam was born in October 1963 in Fujian Province, China. He began studying Western and Chinese paintings in 1978 under the guidance of masters such as Wu Gouguang, Lin Guang, Chen Ting and Liu Mu. 

He immigrated to Hong Kong in 1984. He returned to China to continue his studies and graduated from the Chinese Painting Department of Beijing Central Academy of Fine Arts in 1990. 

Lam took a teaching post at the Hong Kong First Institute of Art and Design upon his graduation, and taught there until 1998.

Career 
Lam has held more than 50 solo exhibitions in Beijing, Hong Kong, New York, Berlin, Milan, Singapore, Taipei and Seoul. Solo exhibitions:

 Centennial Exhibition of Chinese Paintings in Beijing
 China National Art Exhibition, the Art Exhibition commemorating the 30th Anniversary of Reform and Opening
 International Ink Painting Biennial Exhibition of Shenzhen
 Contemporary Hong Kong Art Biennial Exhibition 

He participated in more than one hundred joint exhibitions around the globe. 

Lam's works have been collected by private and corporate organizations, both locally and overseas. 

Museum collections: 

 National Art Museum of China
 Research Institute of Chinese Painting in Beijing\
 Guangzhou Museum of Art
 Shenzhen Museum of Art
 Hong Kong Museum of Art
 Heritage Museum of Hong Kong
 Hong Kong Government House
 Hong Kong Trade Development Council of Washington

Other collections:

 Cathay Pacific
 Hong Kong Four Seasons Hotel
 Macau Four Seasons Hotel
 Hong Kong Mandarin Oriental Hotel
 Beijing Shangri-La Hotel
 United Airlines
 Credit Suisse HK Representative Offices

He published more than twenty albums of his work. 

He served as chairman of the Hong Kong International Art Association. He works as a professional painter. He is a member of the China Artists Association, a member of the Founding Committee of the Chinese Painting Institute, a specialist of the Li Keran Academy of Painting, visiting painter of the Shenzhen Art Gallery and consultant of the 4-D Art Club.

References

External links 

20th-century Chinese painters
1963 births
Painters from Fujian
Living people